Nicolas Daws (born December 22, 2000) is a German–Canadian professional ice hockey goaltender for the Utica Comets of the American Hockey League (AHL) as a prospect to the New Jersey Devils of the National Hockey League (NHL). He was selected 84th overall by the Devils in the 2020 NHL Entry Draft.

Playing career
Daws was selected with the 84th overall pick of the 2020 NHL Entry Draft by the New Jersey Devils. On November 13, 2020, he signed a one-year contract with ERC Ingolstadt of the Deutsche Eishockey Liga (DEL). On May 5, 2021, Daws signed a three-year, entry-level contract with the Devils.

Daws started the 2021–22 season with the Utica Comets of American Hockey League (AHL), the AHL affiliate of the Devils. Daws was recalled by the Devils on October 21, 2021, and made his NHL debut on October 23 in a 2–1 overtime win against the Buffalo Sabres.

Personal life
Daws has dual citizenship due to his father being from Canada and his mother being from Germany.

Career statistics

Regular season and playoffs

International

Awards and honours

References

External links
 

2000 births
Living people
Canadian ice hockey goaltenders
ERC Ingolstadt players
German ice hockey goaltenders
Guelph Storm players
New Jersey Devils draft picks
New Jersey Devils players
Sportspeople from Munich
Utica Comets players